The Augusta Jaguars (formerly Augusta State Jaguars and Georgia Regents Jaguars) are the athletic teams that represent Augusta University, located in Augusta, Georgia, in intercollegiate sports at the Division II level of the National Collegiate Athletic Association (NCAA), primarily competing in the Peach Belt Conference since the 1991–92 academic year. Augusta's men's and women's golf programs compete at the Division I level as affiliate members of the Southland Conference.

Augusta competes in thirteen intercollegiate varsity sports. Men's sports include baseball, basketball, cross country, golf, tennis, and track and field; while women's sports include basketball, cross country, golf, softball, tennis, track and field, and volleyball.

AU retains the athletics legacy of Augusta State University, which merged with Georgia Health Sciences University (formerly the Medical College of Georgia) in 2013 to form Georgia Regents University. The name became Augusta University in 2015.

AU's colors are a dark blue and gray. They have two main rivals: the USC Aiken Pacers, located 30 minutes away and a PBC division foe, and the Paine College Lions, a city rival; Paine College is located on 15th Street across from the Health Sciences campus of AU.

Conference affiliations 
NCAA
 Big South Conference (1983–1990)
 Peach Belt Conference (1991–present)

Golf

Men's golf
The men's golf team has made a name for itself over the years competing at the Division I level, with multiple NCAA Championships appearances. It made history in 2010, winning the National Championship, and repeating as back-to-back champions in 2011. They annually host a collegiate tournament hosted at Forest Hills. From 2014 to 2021, the men's golf team was a member of the Mid-Eastern Athletic Conference (MEAC); it was that league's first-ever associate member in any sport, and also the first school with any level of MEAC membership that was not a historically black institution. After the 2020–21 season, Augusta moved both men's and women's golf to the Southland Conference.

Some alumni include Vaughn Taylor, Patrick Reed, Gary Murphy, Scott Jamieson, and Oliver Wilson.

2010 National Championship
The team's regular season qualified the team for the postseason with nine consecutive top-five finishes, including three wins under head coach Josh Gregory. After finishing sixth in medal play to qualify for the NCAA's new playoff format, the Jaguars defeated Georgia Tech 3-2 in the opening round, Florida State 4-1 in the semifinals, and host Oklahoma State 3-2 to win their first national title. Patrick Reed, Henrik Norlander, and Mitch Krywulycz all won their matches against the top-seeded Cowboys, with Krywulycz clinching the victory on the first extra hole.

In the NCAA National Championship, the team:
Patrick Reed; finished T-58 in the medal round, went 3-0 in match play, ended the year ranked No. 9
Henrik Norlander; finished 5th in the medal round, went 3-0 in match play, ended the year ranked No. 12
Mitch Krywulycz; finished T-51 in the medal round, went 1-2 in match play, ended the year ranked No. 61
Taylor Floyd; finished T-72 in the medal round, went 1-2 in match play, ended the year ranked No. 175
Carter Newman; finished T-146 in the medal round, went 2-1 in match play, ended the year ranked No. 237

2011 National Championship
Featuring four future professional players on its roster, the 2011 men's golf squad took down Georgia 3-2 in the final after taking down Georgia Tech 3-2 and then host Oklahoma State 3-2 in the semifinals. The title made the Jags the first team since the 1984–1985 Houston squad to repeat as Division I National Champions.

In the NCAA Championship, the team:
Patrick Reed; finished T-3, went 3-0 in match play, ended the year ranked No. 4
Henrik Norlander; finished T-56, went 1-2 in match play, ended the year ranked No. 16
Carter Newman; finished T-50, went 3-0 in match play, ended the year ranked No. 108
Mitch Krywulycz; finished T-94, went 2-1 in match play, ended the year ranked No. 121
Olle Bengtsson; finished 139, went 0-3 in match play, ended the year ranked No. 330

Head coach Josh Gregory, who led both squads, accepted a job with his alma mater SMU after winning the second title.

Women's golf
The women's program gained steadily competing as a Division I independent on its men's counterpart, competing in back-to-back NCAA Regionals in 2011 and 2012, the team's first back-to-back postseason appearance. The teams hosts an annual tournament at Forest Hills Golf Club that attracts many top-50 teams. AU women's golf joined the Southland Conference alongside the men's team.

Basketball

Men's basketball

Men's hoops is one of the most popular sports at the university, and are frequently near the top of the PBC standings and show in the national rankings. The 2008–2010 squads set a high standard of success, going to three consecutive Elite Eights, including a national title game appearance in 2008.

Garret Siler graduated holding the NCAA record for field goal percentage, and played a short stint with the Phoenix Suns afterwards. Ben Madgen also enjoyed a highly decorated career as a Jaguar, and went on to a stellar career in the NBL in Australia, where he hailed from.

NCAA Division II title game appearances: Two (2008, 2022)
NCAA Elite Eights: Three (2008, 2009, 2010, 2022)
NCAA Tournament appearances: Eleven, most recently in 2023.

Women's basketball
The women's hoops team has had runs of success, with a 2004 Elite Eight appearance  and final ranking in the top 10. They enjoyed a 20-win season in 2012, clinching the PBC East division crown.

The squad competes in Christenberry Fieldhouse.

Baseball
The head baseball coach is Chris Howell. All home baseball games in 2019 are scheduled at Jaguar Field on the Forest Hills Campus after playing at Lake Olmstead Stadium for most of their home games from 2009 to 2013 and all of their home games from 2014 to 2018.

Shannon Wilkerson set a high standard for the team, garnering Division II Player of the Year honors in 2009 and getting drafted by the Boston Red Sox as he became the first player to earn back-to-back All-American honors.

Softball
Augusta softball plays their home games at Jaguar Field, and reached four consecutive NCAA Regionals from 2008–2012 – finishing within one game twice of advancing the Super Regionals in that span. Kacee Camp became the first Jaguar in school history to earn Academic All-American honors in 2012, batting .390 and graduating with a 3.88 GPA in Biology.

Tennis

Men's tennis
Competing in what is regarded as one of the premier tennis conferences in Division II with plenty of teams dotting the NCAA Top 25 rankings annually, the men's tennis team has enjoyed consistent success as they keep qualifying for NCAA Tournament play.

In 2012, the team enjoyed its winningest season ever, notching a 19-10 record as they defeated conference foes Lander and Columbus 
State, then upset No. 17 Drury and No. 9-ranked Grand Valley State in consecutive matches to make their first Final Four appearance. The team finished the year ranked No. 9 and placed Bernardo Fernandes on the All-American squad, both firsts.

The squad is coached by Micahel McGrath.

Women's tennis
The women's squad has earned nine NCAA Regional berths since 1999, and is coached by Michael McGrath. Their home matches are played at Newman Tennis Center.

In 1992, the women's team won the Peach Belt Conference, under coach Richard Hatfield.  Senior Cheri Cathey,  juniors Andrea Barnes and Kimberley Kile, and Freshmen Courtley Winter and Aimee Woo were named All-Conference.

Volleyball
The women's volleyball team hosts their home matches in Christenberry Fieldhouse, and is coached by Sharon Bonaventure. The Jaguars still hold the PBC record for most aces per set, at 3.20 from the 1992 squad. The 2009 edition enjoyed success behind the power of Jessica Howard, who was named a Daktronics Second-Team All-American.

Cross country

Men's cross country
The men's cross country team was restarted in 2011 and immediately made an impact, winning the conference championship in 2011 and then stepping up further by finishing third in the 2013 Southeast Regional to advance to the NCAA National Championships.

They host the Jaguar Invitational annually in Augusta, Ga.

Women's cross country
The women's team set a new program best by qualifying for the 2008 NCAA Championships after a second-place finish in the Southeast Regional. They won three events, with another two top-five finishes on the season. They finished second in the 2011 PBC Championships, and are coached by Adam Ward.

Professional athletes

References